Pak Chol-jin (born 5 September 1985) is a North Korean international football player. He currently plays for Amrokgang in the DPR Korea League.

He played in the North Korean team that qualified for the 2010 FIFA World Cup in South Africa.

References

External links

Pak Chol-jin at DPRKFootball

1985 births
Living people
Sportspeople from Pyongyang
North Korean footballers
North Korea international footballers
2010 FIFA World Cup players
Amnokgang Sports Club players
2011 AFC Asian Cup players
Footballers at the 2006 Asian Games
Association football defenders 
Association football midfielders
Asian Games competitors for North Korea